Laugasa is a genus of moths of the family Erebidae. Its only species, Laugasa perillalis, is found in Rio de Janeiro, Brazil. Both the genus and species were first described by Francis Walker in 1859.

References

Calpinae
Monotypic moth genera